Long Distance Calling is the third studio album by German post-rock/post-metal band Long Distance Calling. It was released on 17 February 2011, through Superball Music and earned the band their first chart entry. The song Middleville features John Bush on vocals.

Track listing

References 

2011 albums
Long Distance Calling (band) albums
Superball Music albums